Greenland competed at the 2022 European Championships in Munich, Germany, from 11–21 August 2022.

Competitors
The following is the list of number of competitors in the Championships:

Table Tennis

Men

Mixed

References

Nations at the 2022 European Championships
2022
European Championships